Le Plessis-Trévise is a commune in the eastern suburbs of Paris, France.

History
The commune of Le Plessis-Trévise was created on 7 July 1899 by detaching a part of the territory of La Queue-en-Brie and merging it with a part of the territory of Chennevières-sur-Marne and a part of the territory of Villiers-sur-Marne.

Population

Transport
Le Plessis-Trévise is served by no station of the Paris Métro, RER, or suburban rail network. The closest station to Le Plessis-Trévise is Villiers-sur-Marne–Le Plessis-Trévise station on Paris RER line E. This station is located in the neighboring commune of Villiers-sur-Marne,  from the town center of Le Plessis-Trévise.

Education
Schools in the commune include:
 Five preschools/nurseries (maternelles): Charcot, La Maréchale, Olympe de Gouges, Saint-Exupéry, Val Roger
 Five elementary schools: Marie-Louise/Marcel Salmon, Marbeau, Jean Moulin, Jean Monnet, Val Roger
 One junior high school: Collège Albert Camus

The senior high school/sixth-form college Lycée Champlain in Chennevières-sur-Marne serves Le Plessis-Trévise.

Twin towns
Le Plessis-Trévise is twinned with:
 Burladingen, Germany since 1988
 Ourém, Portugal since 1992
 Wągrowiec, Poland since 2006

See also
Communes of the Val-de-Marne department

References

External links

 Official website of Le Plessis-Trévise

Communes of Val-de-Marne